Myolisi Fumba (born 28 January 1997) is a South African cricketer. He made his first-class debut for Western Province in the 2017–18 Sunfoil 3-Day Cup on 30 November 2017. He made his List A debut for Western Province in the 2017–18 CSA Provincial One-Day Challenge on 3 December 2017.

References

External links
 

1997 births
Living people
South African cricketers
Western Province cricketers
Place of birth missing (living people)